Cyrtostachys is a genus of flowering plant in the family Arecaceae. Its species are found in southeast Asia, New Guinea, and in some of the South-Central and Southwest Pacific island habitats of the Oceanian realm.

Species:
 Cyrtostachys bakeri Heatubun - Papua New Guinea
 Cyrtostachys barbata Heatubun - western New Guinea
 Cyrtostachys elegans Burret - central New Guinea
 Cyrtostachys excelsa Heatubun - western New Guinea
 Cyrtostachys glauca H.E.Moore - Papua New Guinea
 Cyrtostachys loriae Becc. -  Solomon Islands, New Guinea, Bismarck Archipelago
 Cyrtostachys renda Blume - Red candle-wax palm - Thailand, Borneo, Malaysia, Sumatra

References

External links 

ipni.org: International Plant Names Index

 
Arecaceae genera
Taxonomy articles created by Polbot